The 2022 TCU Horned Frogs football team represented Texas Christian University in the 2022 NCAA Division I FBS football season. The Horned Frogs played their home games at Amon G. Carter Stadium in Fort Worth, Texas, and competed in the Big 12 Conference. They were led by first-year head coach Sonny Dykes. TCU compiled a perfect 12-0 regular season record; its first undefeated regular season since 2010. After an overtime loss in the 2022 Big 12 Championship Game against Kansas State by a score of 31–28, TCU was selected as the third seed in the four-team College Football Playoff. In the semifinal round, TCU beat #2 Michigan in the Fiesta Bowl. They defeated Michigan by a score of 51–45, becoming the first Big 12 team to win a College Football Playoff game as well as make the CFP National Championship game. TCU lost the National Championship game to the Georgia Bulldogs by a score of 65-7 and finished the season ranked #2 in both the AP and Coaches Polls.

Previous season

The Horned Frogs finished the 2021 season with a record of 3-6 in Big 12 Play and 5-7 overall.

Offseason

Departures

Outgoing Transfers
7 Horned Frog players elected to enter the NCAA Transfer Portal after the 2021 season.

Arrivals

Incoming Transfers

Preseason

Big 12 media poll
The preseason poll was released on July 7, 2022.

Preseason Big-12 awards 
2022 Preseason All-Big 12 teams

Source:

Schedule

Game summaries

at Colorado

Tarleton State (FCS)

at SMU

No. 18 Oklahoma

at No. 19 Kansas (College GameDay)

No. 8 Oklahoma State

No. 17 Kansas State

at West Virginia

Texas Tech (Big Noon Kickoff)

at No. 18 Texas (College GameDay)

at Baylor (Big Noon Kickoff)

Iowa State

No. 10 Kansas State (College GameDay)

No. 2 Michigan (Fiesta Bowl / CFP Semifinal)

No. 1 Georgia (National Championship)

Personnel

Roster

Coaching staff

Rankings

References

TCU
TCU Horned Frogs football seasons
Fiesta Bowl champion seasons
TCU Horned Frogs football